The 232nd Infantry Division was an infantry division of the German Heer during World War II.

Operational history 

The 232nd Infantry Division was formed on 26 June 1944 in Wehrkreis IX as a division of the twenty-seventh Aufstellungswelle. It was formed at Wildflecken military exercise base from the Wildflecken Shadow Division, which had also been used to replenish the 715th Infantry Division early in the month of June 1944. The 232nd Infantry Division initially consisted of the Grenadier Regiments 1043, 1044 and 1045, as well as the Artillery Regiment 232. The division's only commander throughout its service was Eccard von Gablenz.

In August 1944, the division was deployed in the reserves of Armee-Abteilung Ligurien in the Italian theater. By February 1945, the division fought in the Apennine Mountains as part of LI Mountain Corps.

The 232nd Infantry Division surrendered to American forces in the area between Brescia and Milan.

Noteworthy individuals 

 Eccard Freiherr von Gablenz, divisional commander of the 232nd Infantry Division.

Literature 

 v. Gablenz, Eccard Freiherr (1947). Einsatz der 232. Infanterie-Division in Italien.

References 

Infantry divisions of Germany during World War II
Military units and formations established in 1944
Military units and formations disestablished in 1945